Survey Research Methods is a peer-reviewed academic journal on survey methodology published by the European Survey Research Association. The journal publishes articles in English discussing methodological issues of survey research. The editor-in-chief is Ulrich Kohler (University of Potsdam).

References

External links 
 

English-language journals
Publications established in 2007
Research methods journals
Triannual journals
Academic journals published by international learned and professional societies
Survey methodology
Communication journals